The Real Fuerte de Nuestra Señora del Pilar de Zaragoza (Royal Fort of Our Lady of the Pillar of Saragossa), also Fort Pilar, is a 17th-century military defense fortress built by the Spanish colonial government in Zamboanga City.  The fort, which is now a regional museum of the National Museum of the Philippines, is a major landmark of the city and it symbolize the cultural heritage.  

Outside the eastern wall is a Marian shrine dedicated to Our Lady of the Pillar, the patroness of the city, pontifically crowned in 12 October 1960 via decree dating from 18 September 1960.

History

Spanish Colonial Period

Establishment

In 1635, upon the requests of the Jesuit missionaries and Bishop Fray Pedro of Cebu, the Spanish governor of the Philippines Juan Cerezo de Salamanca (1633–1635) approved the building of a stone fort in defense against pirates and raiders of the sultans of Mindanao and Jolo. The cornerstone of the fort, originally called Real Fuerte de San José (Royal Fort of Saint Joseph), was laid by Melchor de Vera, a Jesuit priest-engineer, on June 23, 1635, which also marks the founding of Zamboanga as a city, then known as Jambangan.

The construction of the early fort continued within the governorship of Sebastián Hurtado de Corcuera (1635–1644), ex-governor of Panama. Because of insufficient manpower, laborers from Cavite, Cebu, Bohol, and Panay had to be imported to help the Spaniards, Mexicans and Peruvians in the construction of the fort. This period also marks the beginning of the Zamboangueño Chavacano as a pidgin that eventually developed into a full-fledged creole language for Zamboangueños.

Early attacks
Fort San José was attacked by the Dutch in 1646 and was later abandoned by the Spanish troops who went back to Manila in 1662 to help fight the Chinese pirate Koxinga who had earlier defeated the Dutch. In 1669, the Jesuit missionaries rebuilt the fort after pirates and raiders had again destroyed it.

In 1718–1719, it was rebuilt by the Spaniard engineer Juan Sicarra upon the orders of Spanish Governor General Fernando Manuel de Bustillo Bustamante y Rueda and was renamed as Real Fuerte de Nuestra Señora del Pilar de Zaragoza (Royal Fort of Our Lady of the Pillar of Zaragoza) in honor of the patron virgin of Spain, Our Lady of the Pillar. A year later Dalasi, king of Bulig, and 3,000 Moro pirates attacked the fort; the defenders repulsed the attack. 

In 1798 the British Royal Navy bombarded the fort but again it proved robust enough to repel the attack. Fort Pilar was the scene of a mutiny of 70 prisoners in 1872.

Marian apparitions

It was in 1734 when a relief of Our Lady of the Pillar was set above the eastern wall of the fort, making it an outdoor shrine with an altar. According to tradition, the Virgin Mary appeared to a soldier on December 6, 1734, at the gate of the city. The soldier asked her to stop, but on recognizing her, he fell to his knees.

On September 21, 1897, at 1:14 PM, a strong earthquake struck the western region of Mindanao. The Virgin Mary made an apparition, and according to visionaries, they saw the Virgin floating in midair over the Basilan Strait. She had her right hand raised to command the onrushing waves to stop, thus saving the city from a tsunami.

American Colonial Period

Following the Spanish–American War, Fort Pilar and its Spanish troops surrendered to the Revolutionary Government of Zamboanga on May 18, 1899, under General Vicente Álvarez, a Zamboangueño, at the onset of the Philippine Revolution against Spain. On November 19, 1899, the fort was captured by U.S. expeditionary forces.

World War II

During World War II in 1942, Japanese forces captured and took control of the fort. It was recaptured by the United States and Filipino troops in March 1945 and was finally and officially turned over to the government of the Republic of the Philippines on July 4, 1946.

Restoration of the Fort
Fort Pilar was recognized as a National Cultural Treasure on August 1, 1973, by Presidential Decree No. 260,  though by then the fort had been in disrepair since World War II.  Restoration was started in the early part of 1980 by the National Museum of the Philippines, which reconstructed three of the four structures inside the fort.  After six years of rehabilitation work, the museum branch opened to the public with a special exhibit on Philippine Contemporary Art.

In October 1987, a permanent exhibit on the marine life of Zamboanga, Basilan and Sulu was opened at the second floor of Structure II showing 400 species of marine life specimens in giant dioramas. Also opened was a special exhibit on the 18th century relics from the Griffin Shipwreck at the ground floor, which coincided with the formal inauguration of the structure.

Former congresswoman and Zamboanga City Mayor Maria Clara Lobregat, one of the staunch supporters of Fort Pilar Museum, and the civic-minded residents of the city greatly contributed to the realization of development projects in the museum.

Fort Pilar today
Fort Pilar is now an outdoor Roman Catholic Marian shrine and a regional branch of the National Museum of the Philippines. Inside the fort, only the southern structure is still in ruins; inside and outside the fort are well maintained gardens. The Paseo del Mar, a reclaimed esplanade, protects the fort from the ravages of the sea.

Sections of the fort

References

Spanish colonial infrastructure in the Philippines
Spanish Colonial Fortifications of the Philippines
Landmarks in the Philippines
Pilar
Buildings and structures in Zamboanga City
History of Zamboanga City
Tourist attractions in Zamboanga City
National Cultural Treasures of the Philippines